Tauno Suvanto (6 August 1924 – 29 November 1974) was a Finnish sprinter. He competed in the men's 400 metres at the 1948 Summer Olympics.

References

External links
 

1924 births
1974 deaths
Athletes (track and field) at the 1948 Summer Olympics
Finnish male sprinters
Olympic athletes of Finland
Place of birth missing